Christian the Younger of Brunswick-Wolfenbüttel (20 September 1599 – 16 June 1626), a member of the House of Welf, titular Duke of Brunswick-Lüneburg and administrator of the Prince-Bishopric of Halberstadt, was a German Protestant military leader during the early years of the Thirty Years' War, fighting against the forces of the Imperial House of Habsburg, Habsburg Spain, and the Catholic League.

Life

Christian was born in 1599 at the Gröningen Priory near Halberstadt (in today's Saxony-Anhalt), the third son of Duke Henry Julius of Brunswick-Lüneburg (1564–1613) with his second wife Elizabeth (1573–1626), daughter of the late King Frederick II of Denmark. After his father's death, he was educated by his maternal uncle, King Christian IV of Denmark, and attended the University of Helmstedt. After the death of his brother Rudolf in 1616, Christian, at the age of 17, was elected his successor as Lutheran administrator of the Halberstadt bishopric. Though he did not obtain any confirmation by the Emperor or the Catholic Church, this position provided him the necessary finances to start a military career.

In 1620 Christian joined the army of Prince Maurice of Orange and fought in the Netherlands against a Spanish army. Later he raised his own army and, in liege to Frederick V, Elector Palatine, he carried out three significant battles: the Battle of Höchst (1622), the Battle of Fleurus (1622), and lastly at the Battle of Stadtlohn (1623). He participated in a number of plunderings and burnings along the France-Germany border and throughout the Netherlands. Christian fought alongside the Count of Mansfeld in the first two engagements, and suffered two losses to the Count of Tilly: an arguable one at Höchst, and his final one at Stadtlohn. Christian's major success was at Fleurus, where his actions directly led to the relieving of the Protestant stronghold of Bergen op Zoom. He died childless from wounds sustained in battle in 1626.

Campaigns of 1622-23

In 1621, Christian was one of the few men to continue rallying behind Frederick V, who had only the year before claimed and been deposed from the throne of Bohemia following his crushing loss at the Battle of White Mountain. Frederick was still leader of the Protestant resistance rooted from the 1618 crushed Bohemian Revolution. What attracted Christian to the cause is arguable, but something that may have had to do with it was the fact that before his campaigning, Christian declared a chivalric love for Elizabeth, Frederick's wife and daughter of James I of England, who at this point of the war had sent several thousand troops under Sir Horace Vere to the Palatinate.

By the end of 1621 he had managed to raise 10,000 troops, with whom he wintered in Westphalia, gathering a great treasure from the dioceses of Münster and Paderborn. Christian's military actions began in 1622 when Ernst von Mansfeld began organizing his forces and expressed interest in linking up with his army, especially after his ally Georg Friedrich, Margrave of Baden-Durlach, was crushingly defeated at the Battle of Wimpfen. They were caught at the Battle of Höchst, 22 June 1622, and although Christian was arguably defeated, he was able to escape with much of his army despite crossing a river under heavy fire and losing all of his baggage. The newly united Protestant army moved into Alsace, leaving Heidelberg, the capital of the Palatinate, to fall to Count von Tilly in September 1622, effectively forcing Frederick V out of the war.

After intense foraging and ravaging of the Alsace region, Christian and Mansfeld moved north in Lorraine, and upon the news of the Spanish siege of Bergen op Zoom, they marched to the relief of the city, fighting the Battle of Fleurus (29 August 1622) and in the midst of the battle, Christian displayed his well-known courage and stubbornness on the field by leading four unsuccessful cavalry charges against the Spanish lines under Fernández de Córdoba. It was on the fifth charge that the Protestant horsemen broke the Spanish lines and paved the way for the Protestant relief of Bergen op Zoom that October. This came at a cost of most of Christian's infantry and one of Christian's arms. Fresh from that victory, Christian spent the winter of 1622–23 in the Spanish Netherlands resting and replenishing his army to what would be in spring 1623 set at roughly 15,000.

Spring 1623 saw a plan between Christian, Mansfeld, the Prince of Transylvania Bethlen Gabor, and his ally Count Thurn to retake Bohemia for the Protestants and to breathe new life into the ailing Protestant cause. The campaign faltered from the start as Count von Tilly received news of the troop movements and positioned himself in Lower Saxony, with reports from Mansfeld coming to Christian that he did not have the money to pay his armies or to campaign, leaving Christian to himself in the north. Outnumbered again, and leading an army that was not as disciplined as that of Tilly, Christian made a break for the relative safety of the United Provinces. He was outrun and outmaneuvered 10 miles short of the Dutch border, and in a stand typical of Christian's bravery, he was nonetheless decisively defeated at the Battle of Stadtlohn on 6 August 1623, when he lost all but 2,000 of this 15,000-man army. Broken, he fled for The Hague with the remnants of his army.

Defeat and death

Christian's defeat signalled the close of the "Palatine Phase" of the Thirty Years' War, and the end of the Protestant rebellion as a whole. Three days after Stadtlohn, Frederick V signed an armistice with Ferdinand II, ending the former's resistance to what seemed as impending Catholic domination of the Holy Roman Empire. Mansfeld shortly thereafter disbanded his army on the Rhine with the entrance of Denmark-Norway, the United Provinces, and England into the war in 1625. Under a plan that involved Christian, Mansfeld, and Christian IV, King of Denmark-Norway, pushing from the United Provinces and from Denmark-Norway, Christian found himself with ample financial backing. Ordered to advance on the Rhineland, he undertook this mission but quickly found himself checked by Tilly in Hesse, and opted this time to retreat rather than fight. Ill from the outset of the campaign, he died at Wolfenbüttel on 16 June 1626 at the age of 26.

Ancestors

References
"Christian-of-Brunswick." Encyclopædia Britannica. 2004.  Encyclopædia Britannica Premium Service. 2 Dec. 2004
 Allgemeine Deutsche Biographie, vol. 4, p. 677-683
Ernst von Mansfeld - notification (also in English) concerning the latest biography about Count Mansfeld (to be published in September 2010)

External links

 

1599 births
1626 deaths
People from Gröningen
Middle House of Brunswick
German military leaders
Knights of the Garter
Lutheran administrators of Halberstadt Prince-Bishopric
Military personnel of the Thirty Years' War
Military personnel of the Holy Roman Empire
University of Helmstedt alumni
Sons of monarchs
Military personnel from Saxony-Anhalt